In 2001–02 season, the French football club SC Bastia finished at the 11th place in league. The top scorer of the season, including 19 goals in 14 league matches have been Tony Vairelles. Bastia were eliminated to Coupe de France final, and in the Coupe de la Ligue it was able to make the quarter final, and the UEFA Intertoto Cup second round.

Transfers

In 
Summer
 Patrick Beneforti from Bastia B
 Pierre Deblock and Cyril Jeunechamp from Auxerre
 Nicolas Dieuze, Reynald Pedros, Fabrice Jau and Cédric Uras from Toulouse
 Anthar Yahia from Inter
 Bernard Lambourde from Portsmouth
 Price Jolibois from Red Star 93
 Tony Vairelles from Lyon
 Damián Manso from Newell's Old Boys

Winter
 Daniel Popovic from free
 Ishmael Addo from Hearts of Oak
 Greg Vanney from Los Angeles Galaxy

Out 
Summer
 Eric Durand to Rennes
 Patrick Moreau to Metz
 Laurent Casanova to retired
 Pierre-Yves André to Nantes
 José Clayton to Stade Tunisien
 Patrick Valery to Aris Thessaloniki
 Piotr Świerczewski to Marseille
 Yann Lachuer to Auxerre
 David Faderne to Caen
 Cyril Domoraud to AS Monaco
 Frédéric Née to Lyon
 Pierre Laurent to Strasbourg

Winter
 No.

Squad

Division 1

League table

Results summary

Results by round

Matches

Coupe de France

Coupe de la Ligue

UEFA Intertoto Cup 

Slaven Belupo won 2–0 on aggregate.

Statistics

Top scorers

League top assists

Notes

References 

SC Bastia seasons
Bastia